David Johansson (born 1935) is a Finnish diplomat and ambassador. He was the Finnish Ambassador to Nairobi and Addis Ababa 1990–1995. Prior to that he was Deputy Director General of the Development Cooperation Department 1983-1987 and Head of Department 1987–1990 in the Ministry for Foreign Affairs.

References

Ambassadors of Finland to Kenya
Ambassadors of Finland to Ethiopia
1935 births
Living people
Date of birth missing (living people)